Mbale District is a district in Eastern Uganda. It is named after the largest city in the district, Mbale, which also serves as the main administrative and commercial center in the sub-region.

Location
Mbale District is bordered by Sironko District to the north, Bududa District to the northeast, Manafwa District to the southeast, Tororo District to the south, Butaleja District to the southwest and Budaka District to the west. Pallisa District and Kumi District lie to the northwest of Mbale District. The coordinates of the district are:00 57N, 34 20E. The districts of Bududa, Manafwa and Sironko were part of Mbale District before they were split off as independent districts of their own.

Population
The national census of 1991 estimated the district population at about 240,900. Eleven years later, in 2002, the national census that year put the population in the district at 332,600, with an annual population growth rate of 2.5%. In 2012, the mid-year population of Mbale District was estimated at 441,300.  A new national population census is planned for August 2014. The district population is 92% rural. The main ethnic group in the district are the Bamasaba or Bagisu. The main language spoken in the district is Lugisu also known as Lumasaba.

Economic activity
The primary economic activity in the district is agriculture. Some of the main crops are coffee, beans, matooke, maize, onions, potatoes, carrots, and sweet potatoes.

Education
 there are several university campuses in Mbale, including the following:

 The Islamic University in Uganda, which was established in 1988, maintains its main campus here.
 The Uganda Christian University, with its main campus in Mukono, established its Mbale campus in 2003.
 LivingStone International University, was established in 2012 and has its main campus in Mbale as well.
 Uganda Martyrs University, with its main campus in Nkozi, established ts Mbale campus in 2009.
Other institutions of learning include Mbale Secondary School, a mixed day middle and high school (grades 8 to 13), with about 4,000 students. The high school graduates about 250 students in mathematics and sciences, making it one of major science schools in Eastern Uganda.

Twinning
Mbale was formally linked with the town Pontypridd, Wales through local and regional twinning ceremonies in 2005. The link was intended to associate professionals and organizations in Pontypridd with their counterparts in Africa, under the auspices of charity Partnerships Overseas Networking Trust.

Prominent people from Mbale

 Werikhe Kafabusa - Uganda's State Minister for Housing, 2006–2011
 Ivan Massa - Ugandan airline pilot

See also

References

External links
 Government District information portal: Mbale

 
Districts of Uganda
Bugisu sub-region
Eastern Region, Uganda